Eknath Vasant Chitnis is an Indian space scientist and a former member secretary at the Indian National Committee for Space Research (INCOSPAR), which evolved into the present-day Indian Space Research Organisation (ISRO). He is also a former director of Space Applications Centre of ISRO and a former colleague of APJ Abdul Kalam, the erstwhile president of India. The Government of India awarded him the Padma Bhushan, the third highest civilian award, in 1985.

It was EV Chitnis who helped Vikram Sarabhai choose location of Thumba Equatorial Rocket Launching Station, which was result of a location hunt done by Chitnis from 1961. It was Chitnis who recommended induction of A. P. J. Abdul Kalam into Indian space program after getting impressed by his resume and recommendation from H.G.S. Murthy (after interview by Murthy) by selecting him for the training under NASA.

In 2008, EV Chitnis was unanimously selected as the Chairman of Press Trust of India.

See also

 Indian space program

References

Recipients of the Padma Bhushan in science & engineering
Year of birth missing
Indian space scientists
Indian Space Research Organisation people